Hidemi (written: 日出海, 秀美 or 英美) is a masculine Japanese given name. Notable people with the name include:

, Japanese weightlifter
, Japanese footballer
, Japanese writer
, Japanese naval officer
, Japanese cellist and conductor

Japanese masculine given names